Damián Enrique Lanza Moyano (born April 10, 1982) is an Ecuadorian former footballer who last played as a goalkeeper for Clan Juvenil in the Ecuador Serie B. Lanza was born in Cuenca and is half Argentinian, through his father.

Career
Lanza began his career in Argentina in Buenos Aires, but failed to make an impact and returned to Ecuador where he has enjoyed more success with Deportivo Cuenca and Aucas. He was in the Ecuador national team for the 2006 FIFA World Cup in Germany. Lanza was considered a surprise selection for the national team by the coach Luis Fernando Suárez.

He successively moved to Europe during the 2006-2007 winter transfer season, joining Italian Serie B club Arezzo. On April 6, 2007 Lanza made his first start for Arezzo against Brescia. His second came the game after against Vicenza Calcio. He however failed to become a regular with the amaranto and was successively released for free following Arezzo's relegation to Serie C1.

On September 28, 2007 he joined the ranks of Genoa C.F.C. in a free transfer as third-choice goalkeeper.  More recently, he was offered a trial at Polish side Wisła Kraków which failed to materialise into any sort of deal. In September, 2009 he joined Emelec as a third-choice goalkeeper.

Honours

Club
Deportivo Cuenca
 Serie A de Ecuador: 2004

References

External links
Lanza's FEF Player Card

Profile at footballdatabase.com

1982 births
Living people
People from Cuenca, Ecuador
Association football goalkeepers
Ecuadorian footballers
Ecuador international footballers
2004 Copa América players
2006 FIFA World Cup players
C.D. Cuenca footballers
S.D. Aucas footballers
S.S. Arezzo players
Genoa C.F.C. players
C.D. Olmedo footballers
Manta F.C. footballers
Barcelona S.C. footballers
Ecuadorian Serie A players
Serie A players
Serie B players
Ecuadorian expatriate footballers
Expatriate footballers in Italy